The Battle of Ballinalee took place during the Irish War of Independence on 4 November 1920. Members of the Irish Republican Army (IRA), led by Seán Mac Eoin, drove a mixed group of Crown forces consisting of Black and Tans and Auxiliary Division personnel from the village of Ballinalee in County Longford.

Crown forces hoped to burn the town as a reprisal for the deaths of several RIC personnel in the preceding days. This included the killing of an RIC inspector, Philip St Johnstone Howlett Kelleher, the previous week and an RIC Constable, Peter Cooney, the previous day. Cooney had been suspected of being a spy and his execution was reputedly ordered by Michael Collins. At the time of his killing, Cooney was allegedly carrying coded dispatches with the names of Longford IRA men.

The Crown forces (numbering 100 men in 11 trucks) were defeated by about 25 IRA members, of which 4 were involved in the main battle. Mac Eoin had placed several groups at the roads leading into the village, including one at a house, Rose Cottage, on the approach to the village centre. This group, referred to in some sources as the "Rose Cottage Four", engaged the much larger RIC force using rifle fire and grenades, and forced their retreat.

The battle was the only one of its kind during the entire conflict.

See also
 North Longford Flying Column

References 

Conflicts in 1920
Military actions and engagements during the Irish War of Independence
Battles involving Ireland
History of County Longford
November 1920 events